Melvin Eugene Carnahan (February 11, 1934 – October 16, 2000) was an American lawyer and politician who served as the 51st Governor of Missouri from 1993 until his death in a plane crash in 2000. A Democrat, he was elected posthumously to the U.S. Senate; his widow, Jean, served in his stead for two years until a special election.

Early life and education
Carnahan was born in Birch Tree, Missouri, and grew up on a small farm near Ellsinore, Missouri, with his only sibling, Robert "Bob" Carnahan. He was the son of Kathel (Schupp) and A. S. J. Carnahan, the superintendent of Ellsinore schools who, in 1944, was elected to the United States House of Representatives, serving from 1945-1947 and 1949-1961.

Carnahan moved with his family to Washington, D.C. in 1945 and returned in 1949, the year he met his future wife Jean.  There he graduated from Anacostia High School in 1952 and earned a Bachelor of Arts (B.A.) in business administration from George Washington University in 1954. He married Jean Anne Carpenter that same year and also entered the United States Air Force during the Korean War and served as a special agent for the Office of Special Investigation rising to the rank of First Lieutenant. In 1956, he and his wife moved back to his home state of Missouri. He received a Juris Doctor (J.D.) from the University of Missouri School of Law in Columbia, Missouri, in 1959.

Political career

State legislator
Carnahan's political career started in 1960 when he was elected to serve as a municipal judge in Rolla. Two years later he was elected as a member of the Missouri House of Representatives representing the Rolla area. He remained in the Missouri house until 1966, winning the position of majority floor leader in his second term. In 1966, he lost an election for the state senate and started practicing law.

State Treasurer
In 1980, Carnahan was elected Missouri State Treasurer. He served in that post from 1981 to 1985. In 1984 he was an unsuccessful candidate for Governor of Missouri, losing the Democratic primary election to then-Lieutenant Governor Kenneth Rothman, who lost the general election that year to state Attorney General John Ashcroft.

Governor of Missouri 
In 1988, he was elected Lieutenant Governor of Missouri. In 1992, he faced Mayor of St. Louis Vincent C. Schoemehl in the Democratic primary for governor. He won the Democratic nomination by a wide margin and went on to easily defeat Republican state Attorney General William L. Webster in the general election. He was elected Governor of Missouri on November 3, 1992, and reelected for a second term on November 5, 1996, defeating Republican State Auditor Margaret B. Kelly.

2000 Senate election and death

In 2000, Carnahan ran in the election against Incumbent Republican Senator John Ashcroft for United States Senator. It was a heated and intense campaign, in which Carnahan traveled all over Missouri to garner support in what was a very close race. All three on board the plane (Mel and Randy Carnahan and Chris Sifford, the governor's campaign advisor and former chief of staff) were killed in the crash.

Lieutenant Governor Roger B. Wilson ascended to the governorship and served out the balance of Carnahan's term, which ended in January 2001. Because Missouri election law would not allow Carnahan's name to be removed from the November 7, 2000, ballot, the campaign chose Carnahan's widow, Jean Carnahan, to unofficially become the new Democratic candidate. Wilson promised to appoint her to the seat, if it became vacant as a result of Mel Carnahan's win in the election. Carnahan's campaign continued using the slogan "I'm Still with Mel." A Senate first, Carnahan posthumously won, by a 2% margin. Jean Carnahan was then appointed to the Senate and served until November 2002, when she was defeated by a 1% margin in a special election by Republican Jim Talent.

Awards and recognitions 
The Armory and Reserve Center in Rolla Missouri was renamed in honor of him in 2001, as The Mel Carnahan Armory and Reserve Center.

A high school, Carnahan High School of the Future, was named after him in 2003.

Personal life
Carnahan and his family were active members of the First Baptist Church of Rolla, where he served as an ordained deacon and member of the building committee. In 1984, he risked his political career by taking a public stand against Missouri ballot issues, Amendments 5 and 7, which would legalize parimutuel betting and create a state lottery. He was one of only a handful of state elected officials to take such a position; however, both amendments passed.

Carnahan married Jean Carpenter in Washington, D.C. on June 12, 1954. They had four children, all lawyers. Russ Carnahan, a former member of the U.S. House of Representatives for Missouri's 3rd District (2005–2013); Tom Carnahan, founder of Wind Capital Group, which builds wind farms; Robin Carnahan, former Missouri Secretary of State (2005–2013); and Roger "Randy" Carnahan, who piloted the plane and perished in the same crash that killed his father.

References

External links
 National Governors Association
 
 

|-

|-

|-

|-

|-

|-

1934 births
2000 deaths
20th-century American politicians
Accidental deaths in Missouri
Baptists from Missouri
Carnahan family
Democratic Party governors of Missouri
Democratic Party United States senators from Missouri
George Washington University School of Business alumni
Lieutenant Governors of Missouri
Democratic Party members of the Missouri House of Representatives
People from Rolla, Missouri
People from Shannon County, Missouri
People from Southeast (Washington, D.C.)
Politicians elected posthumously
State treasurers of Missouri
United States Air Force officers
University of Missouri alumni
Victims of aviation accidents or incidents in the United States
Victims of aviation accidents or incidents in 2000